The 2002–03 season is JS Kabylie's 38th season in the Algerian top flight, They will be competing in National 1, the Algerian Cup and the CAF Cup.

Squad list
Players and squad numbers last updated on 1 September 2002.Note: Flags indicate national team as has been defined under FIFA eligibility rules. Players may hold more than one non-FIFA nationality.

Competitions

Overview

{| class="wikitable" style="text-align: center"
|-
!rowspan=2|Competition
!colspan=8|Record
!rowspan=2|Started round
!rowspan=2|Final position / round
!rowspan=2|First match	
!rowspan=2|Last match
|-
!
!
!
!
!
!
!
!
|-
| National

|  
| 4th
| 22 August 2002
| 12 May 2003
|-
| Algerian Cup

| Round of 64
| Quarter-finals
| 2 March 2003
| 17 April 2003
|-
| 2002 CAF Cup

| Quarter-finals
| style="background:gold;"|Finals
| 
| 24 November 2002
|-
| 2003 CAF Cup

| colspan=2|Second round
| 17 May 2003
| 30 May 2003
|-
! Total

National

League table

Results summary

Results by round

Matches

Algerian Cup

2002 CAF Cup

Quarter-finals

Semi-finals

Final

2003 CAF Cup

Second round

Squad information

Playing statistics

|-

|-
! colspan=12 style=background:#dcdcdc; text-align:center| Players transferred out during the season

Goalscorers
Includes all competitive matches. The list is sorted alphabetically by surname when total goals are equal.

Clean sheets
Includes all competitive matches.

Transfers

In

Out

Notes

References

JS Kabylie seasons
JS Kabylie